The Kingdom of Mankhera and Dera, also known as Mankhera or Leah and Bukkar, was a powerful Indian State that arose under the declining influence of the Mughal Empire and Durrani Empire. Initially the rulers of Mankera were governors of the Sindh Sagar Doab under the Emperors of Afghanistan. However, with the death of Ahmad Shah Abidali in 1772, it along with several other polities of Punjab became Independent. The state was founded by Nawab Sarbuland Khan, who was succeeded by his son-in-law, Nawab Ahmad Khan and his progeny. The state comprised much of the Sindh-Sagar Doab, and the modern districts of Mianwali, Bhakkar, Layyah as well as the south-western districts of Khyber Pakhtunkhwa below Kohat including Dera Ismail Khan, Karak, Bannu and Marwat. The Kingdom was comparable in size to modern day Switzerland.

References 

History of India
Mughal Empire
Durrani Empire